Eric López may refer to:
 Eric Lopez (voice actor), Mexican-American voice actor
 Eric López (footballer) (born 1993), Spanish footballer
 Eric Lopez (soccer) (born 1999), American soccer player
 Erik López (born 2001), Paraguayan footballer

See also
 Erick López (born 1972), Cuban gymnast
 Erick López Barriga (born 1971), Mexican politician
 Erika Lopez (born 1968), American novelist